Tonyrefail railway station served the village of Tonyrefail, in the historical county of Glamorgan, Wales, from 1901 to 1958 on the Ely Valley Railway.

History
The station was opened on 1 May 1901 by the Great Western Railway. It closed on 9 June 1958.

References

Disused railway stations in Rhondda Cynon Taf
Former Great Western Railway stations
Railway stations in Great Britain opened in 1901
Railway stations in Great Britain closed in 1958
1901 establishments in Wales
1958 disestablishments in Wales